Old Potter, also known as Potter Junction, is an unincorporated community in Potter Township, Polk County, Arkansas, United States. It is located along U.S. Route 59/U.S. Route 71 south of Mena, where Highway 375 (AR 375) begins.

References

Unincorporated communities in Polk County, Arkansas
Unincorporated communities in Arkansas